HMS Sealark was a Royal Navy Cuckoo-class schooner of four 12-pounder carronades and a crew of 20. She was built by William Wheaton at Brixham  and launched in 1806. Like many of her class and the related Ballahoo-class schooners, she succumbed to the perils of the sea relatively early in her career.

Service
She was commissioned in October 1806 under Lieutenant Thomas Banks for the North Sea. Sealark was at the surrender of the Danish Fleet after the Battle of Copenhagen on 7 September. The prize money amounted to £3 8s for an ordinary seaman, or slightly over two months wages. In 1809 she came under the command of Lieutenant James Procter.

Fate
A heavy sea swamped her and she sank immediately. Only one member of her crew survived. On 29 June 1809 The Times printed the following: "The Sealark schooner has been upset on the coast of Holland and all hands on board, excepting one man, unfortunately perished."

Citations

References
 
 
 Shipwrecks of the revolutionary & Napoleonic eras (Chatham). 
 
 

 

1806 ships
Cuckoo-class schooners
Maritime incidents in 1809
Ships built in Devon